Brony  is a village which is in the administrative district of Gmina Krzyżanów, within Kutno County, Łódź Voivodeship, in central Poland.

The village has a population of 80.

Etymology
Brony's name is from the Polish word for "harrows".

History
From 1975 to 1998, Brony belonged to the Płock Voivodeship.

References

Villages in Kutno County